James Cox Chambers (born 1956/57) is an American billionaire heir, renewable energy businessman, biodynamic farmer, and filmmaker. As of May 2022, his net worth was estimated at US$4.7 billion

Early life
Chambers is the son of Anne Cox Chambers the former US Ambassador to Belgium, and the grandson of newspaper publisher, three-time Governor of Ohio, and 1920 Democratic nominee for President James M. Cox. He has two half-sisters from his mother's first marriage, Katharine Ann Johnson and Margaretta Johnson. He graduated from Bard College in 1982.

Career
Chambers is a renewable energy businessman, biodynamic farmer, and filmmaker. Chambers is a co-owner of the Atlanta Hawks, publisher of the Atlanta Constitution, and Atlanta Journal newspapers. Chambers also resides on the Board of Trustees of Bard College as Chair and is on the board of directors for the Communities in Schools. Chambers appeared in the 1984 film Alphabet City.

Wealth
In 2015, his mother Anne Cox Chambers distributed her 49% share in Cox Enterprises equally between her three children. As of June 2018, his net worth is $6.3 billion.

Personal life
In 1982, Chambers married fellow Bard College alumna and actress Lauren Hamilton, who is the daughter of NASA scientist, mathematician and computer pioneer Margaret Hamilton and James Cox Hamilton, both of Cambridge, Massachusetts. They have a son, James Cox "Jim" Chambers Jr.

Chambers later married Nabila Khashoggi, daughter of billionaire Adnan Khashoggi. They have a son and live in Palisades, New York, US.

References

External links 
 

1950s births
American billionaires
Bard College alumni
Cox family
Living people
Place of birth missing (living people)